The Đuống River, also known as the Thiên Đức River, is a river of Vietnam. It flows for  through Bắc Ninh Province and Hanoi.

The river features in the poem "On the Other Side of the Đuống River" by Hoàng Cầm.

Gallery

References

Rivers of Bắc Ninh province
Rivers of Hanoi
Rivers of Vietnam